This is a list of video games that have the sport of ice hockey as their subject.

Video games

See also 
 NHL (video game series)
 NHL 2K
 Sports game

References 

Ice hockey video games
Ice hockey
 
Video games